Cassady Marie McClincy is an American actress best known for her portrayal of Lydia on the AMC horror-drama television series The Walking Dead since 2019.

Life and career 
McClincy was born in Ohio and raised in Georgia. She got an agent and began acting at the age of 9. McClincy has guest starred in Lifetime's Drop Dead Diva, NBC's Constantine, TNT's Good Behavior and Amazon Prime Video's original anthology series Lore. In 2017, she made recurring guest star appearances on the Netflix original series Ozark, the Hulu original series Castle Rock and VH1's Daytime Divas.

At the age of 17, McClincy began to portray Lydia in The Walking Dead during season 9 and became a series regular beginning with season 10.

Filmography

Film

Television

References

External links 

Living people
Actresses from Georgia (U.S. state)
American child actresses
American film actresses
American people of Thai descent
American television actresses
2000 births